The men's 20 kilometres walk event at the 2009 World Championships in Athletics was held throughout the city of Berlin on August 15, beginning and ending at the Brandenburg Gate.

Medalists

Records

Qualification standards

Schedule

Competition notes
With the 2007 champion and 2008 Olympic silver medallist Jefferson Pérez having retired, the reigning Olympic champion Valeriy Borchin was regarded as strong favourite. He had recorded the world-leading time prior to the tournament and had been undefeated that season. The Olympic third and fourth-place finishers, Jared Tallent and Wang Hao, were regarded as the strongest challengers to Borchin. Italians Giorgio Rubino and Ivano Brugnetti were singled out as medal contenders, while former world record holder and three-time World silver medallist Paquillo Fernández was seen as being past his peak.

Borchin prevailed and was first to cross the line at the Brandenburg gate, with a winning time of 1:18:41. Chinese athlete Hao improved upon his previous best to take the silver medal while Mexican Eder Sánchez produced a season's best performance for the bronze medal. The veteran competitor Paquillo Fernández withdrew from the race before the halfway mark.

Despite becoming the reigning World and Olympic champion, Borchin stated that he needed to achieve much more to match the achievements of his sporting heroes Jefferson Pérez and Robert Korzeniowski.

Results
The medals of some of the athletics world championship events in 2009 were re-awarded 24 March 2016 as a result of doping disqualifications. Among these reallocations were the medals of the 20 km walk, which saw the Italian Giorgio Rubino, who originally finished fourth, awarded the bronze medal.

This allowed Italy to enter the medal table, with another bronze medal awarded to Antonietta Di Martino in 2019.

Key:  DNF = Did not finish, DQ = Disqualified, NR = National record, PB = Personal best, SB = Seasonal best

References
General
20 kilometres race walk results IAAF.
Specific

Walk 20 kilometres
Racewalking at the World Athletics Championships